The Dave Peterson Award is presented annually by USA Hockey (the governing body for amateur ice hockey in the United States) to the best American goaltender in junior ice hockey. It is USA Hockey's top award for the position of goaltender. The award is named for Dave Peterson, former director of coaching and player development for USA Hockey and coach of the United States men's national ice hockey team.

List of winners
2021–22: Alex Tracy – Sioux City Musketeers
2020–21: Jake Sibell – Aberdeen Wings
2019–20: Dustin Wolf – Everett Silvertips
2018–19: Isaiah Saville – Tri-City Storm
2017–18: Zach Driscoll – Omaha Lancers
2016–17: Keith Petruzzelli – Muskegon Lumberjacks
2015–16: Hunter Miska – Dubuque Fighting Saints
2014–15: Eric Schierhorn – Muskegon Lumberjacks
2013–14: Cal Petersen – Waterloo Blackhawks
2012–13: Charlie Lindgren – Sioux Falls Stampede
2011–12: Ryan McKay – Green Bay Gamblers
2010–11: John Gibson – USNTDP Juniors
2009–10: Jack Campbell – USNTDP Juniors
2008–09: Mike Lee – Fargo Force
2007–08: Drew Palmisano – Omaha Lancers
2006–07: Jeremy Smith – Plymouth Whalers
2005–06: Alex Stalock – Cedar Rapids RoughRiders
2004–05: Jeff Lerg – Omaha Lancers
2003–04: Cory Schneider – USNTDP Juniors
2002–03: Dominic Vicari – River City Lancers
2001–02: Jimmy Howard – USNTDP Juniors

References

Ice hockey goaltender awards
American ice hockey trophies and awards
^